The Hybrid Wireless Mesh Protocol (HWMP), part of IEEE 802.11s, is a basic routing protocol for a wireless mesh network.  It is based on AODV (RFC 3561) and tree-based routing.  It relies on a Peer Link Management protocol by which each Mesh Point discovers and tracks neighboring nodes.  If any of these are connected to a wired backhaul, there is no need for HWMP, which selects paths from those assembled by compiling all mesh point peers into one composite map.

The HWMP protocol is hybrid, because it consists of a proactive tree-based hierarchical routing protocol, and an on-demand logic, based on the Ad-hoc On Demand Vector protocol (AODV). In contradiction with classic IP based (ISO level 3) routing, the HWMP protocol is based on ISO level 2 (based on MAC addresses).

HWMP is intended to displace proprietary protocols used by vendors like Meraki for the same purpose, permitting peer participation by open source router firmware. The open source implementation of 802.11s (open80211s) has been integrated to the Linux kernel by Cozybit Inc.  FreeBSD supports HWMP starting with FreeBSD 8.0.

References

IEEE 802.11
Network protocols